Molly J. Huskey is an American lawyer and jurist serving as a judge of the Idaho Court of Appeals. Appointed by Governor Butch Otter, she assumed her role in July 2015.

Education 
Huskey graduated from Moscow High School in 1984. She earned a Bachelor of Arts degree in public relations from the University of Idaho in 1989 and a Juris Doctor from the University of Idaho College of Law in 1993. In 2020, she earned a Master of Laws in judicial studies from the Duke University School of Law. During her time at Duke, Huskey's roommate was Judge Susan Oki Mollway.

Career 
Prior to her appointment as a judge, Huskey served as a public defender and prosecutor in Bonneville County, Idaho. In 1998, she joined the Office of the Idaho Appellate Public Defender. She was appointed to serve as the state appellate public defender by Governor Dirk Kempthorne in 2002.

References 

Living people
Idaho lawyers
University of Idaho alumni
University of Idaho College of Law alumni
Duke University School of Law alumni
Public defenders
People from Moscow, Idaho
Year of birth missing (living people)